Dichomeris apicispina is a moth of the family Gelechiidae. It was described by Hou-Hun Li and Zhe-Min Zheng in 1996. It is known from the Shaanxi and Jiangxi provinces in China.

References

apicispina
Moths described in 1996